The Tadvi Bhil is an tribal community found in the states of Maharashtra, Gujarat, Madhya Pradesh and Rajasthan in India. They are from the larger Bhil ethnic group, and are a clan of it. They use the surname Tadvi or sometimes the name of their Kul or Gan; the Dhankas of Gujarat and Maharashtra use Tadvi or Tetariya.

History and origin

The Tadvi Bhil inhabit an area which roughly covers the border areas of the states of Gujarat, Madhya Pradesh and Maharashtra. This territory forms the core of the Faruqi kingdom, a medieval state in central India. In the Western part of this area, Tadvis and Vasavas are mainly Hindu but some Christian missionary activities are seen in this region. A close association between the Bhil of this region, and the Faruqi state led to the conversion of some of them to Islam. The dance that they perform on various occasions is known as Timli or Sajoni, or commonly known as tribal dance.

Present circumstance

The Tadvi speak a dialect of their own, also known as Tadvi, but many are switching to 
Marathi. Their language is also Dhanka and Bhilori, which belongs to the Bhil group. They inhabit villages which are largely Tadvi. The community consist mainly of small cultivators. Like the wider Bhil community, they currently practise gotra exogamy, and are endogamous.

, the Tadvi Bhil of Rajasthan were classified as a Scheduled Tribe under the Indian government's reservation program of positive discrimination.

References

External links

Bhil clans
Muslim communities of Maharashtra
Muslim communities of Madhya Pradesh
Scheduled Tribes of Rajasthan
Muslim communities of Rajasthan

ur:تدوی بهیل